The 1965 All-Ireland Senior Football Championship Final was the 78th All-Ireland Final and the deciding match of the 1965 All-Ireland Senior Football Championship, an inter-county Gaelic football tournament for the top teams in Ireland.

Match

Summary
For the first time since the 1941 All-Ireland Final, the same two counties contested the decider in successive years. However, it was far from the magical spectacle that fans expected, given the high-scoring performance that both sides gave in the 1964 final. Destructive football and indiscriminate jersey-pulling, leading to three players being sent-off, marred a game that never delivered as much as it had promised. 13 of the 21 scores came from frees, both Bernie O'Callaghan and Cyril Dunne called upon many times to edge their county ahead. It was essentially "Survival of the Fittest", but even in this unpromising setting, there were some performances of real merit. Pat Donnnellan, who had outplayed Denis O'Sullivan early on, stepped into the breach at a stage when O'Callaghan had reduced Kerry's arrears to a minimum. The Kerry resurgence had been fueled by a vintage period for Mick O'Connell, but when the Galway mentors switched Donnellan onto the Valentia man, midfield control - slight though it was - swung back to the reigning champions. With 15 minutes remaining, Seamus Leydon had Galway's twelfth point but Kerry had not the ability to profit from this period of stagnation, and their only return for some enthusiastic, but poorly organised attacks, was the pointed frees from O'Connell and O'Callaghan. The margin of three points hardly flattered Galway but the Tribesmen had too much on the day for Kerry and duly collected their second consecutive All-Ireland title. 

It was the second of three in a row All-Ireland football titles won by Galway in the 1960s, which made them joint "team of the decade" with Down who also won three.

Galway's three 1960s titles came consecutively.

Details

References

All-Ireland Senior Football Championship Final
All-Ireland Senior Football Championship Final, 1965
All-Ireland Senior Football Championship Finals
All-Ireland Senior Football Championship Finals
Galway county football team matches
Kerry county football team matches